George Venables-Vernon, 2nd Baron Vernon (9 May 1735 – 18 June 1813), was the 2nd Baron Vernon of Kinderton. He acceded to the title in 1780 after the death of his father George Venables-Vernon, first Baron Vernon of Kinderton.

Vernon was educated at Westminster School and at Trinity Hall, Cambridge, proceeding MA in 1755. He served as a Whig member of parliament for Weobley from 1757 to 1761, Bramber from 1762 to 1768 and Glamorganshire from 1768 to 1780.

His first wife was Louisa Barbara Mansel, daughter of Bussy Mansel, last Baron Mansel of Margam. They wed on 16 July 1757 and had two sons and two daughters, who died young. He married again, this time to Jane Georgiana Fauquier, daughter of William Fauquier of Hanover, on 25 May 1786. With her he had two more daughters, one of whom died young.

He inherited the Briton Ferry estate in Glamorgan and Newick Park in Sussex in 1750 through his first wife and served as vice president of the Welch Charity. He inherited the family seat at Sudbury Hall in Derbyshire in 1780 on the death of his father.  Bradwall Hall, near Sandbach, Cheshire, was also owned by the Barons Vernon until it was conveyed to John Latham (1761–1843), president of the Royal College of Physicians.

His full-length portrait was painted by Thomas Gainsborough (1727–1788) in 1767. The painting, which is often referred to as "The Hunting Lord," belongs to Southampton City Art Gallery's permanent collection, acquired 1957.

After Vernon died in 1813, his title passed to his half-brother Henry, the eldest son of the first Baron's third marriage.

References

1735 births
1813 deaths
People educated at Westminster School, London
Alumni of Trinity Hall, Cambridge
Members of the Parliament of Great Britain for English constituencies
Members of the Parliament of Great Britain for Welsh constituencies
British MPs 1754–1761
British MPs 1761–1768
British MPs 1768–1774
British MPs 1774–1780
George 2